The Rise and Rise of Michael Rimmer is a 1970 British satirical film starring Peter Cook, and co-written by Cook, John Cleese, Graham Chapman, and Kevin Billington, who directed the film. The film was devised and produced by David Frost under the pseudonym "David Paradine". Cleese and Chapman began writing the script following patronage from Frost. Cook and Billington were later called upon to complete the writing as, according to Cleese, he and Chapman "had no idea what they were doing".

The film satirised the growing influence of PR, spin and opinion polls in British politics, as well as parodying political figures of the time such as Harold Wilson and Enoch Powell. Cook admitted later that he had partly based his portrayal of the Rimmer character on David Frost, who provided funding for the film and took an executive producer credit.

Plot
The mysterious Michael Rimmer (Cook) appears at a small and ailing British advertising agency, where the employees assume he is working on a time and motion study. However, he quickly begins to assert a de facto authority over the firm's mostly ineffectual staff and soon acquires control of the business from the incompetent boss Ferret (Arthur Lowe). Rimmer then succeeds in establishing the newly invigorated firm as the country's leading polling agency, and begins to make regular TV appearances as a polling expert. He subsequently moves into politics, acting as an adviser to the leader of the Tory opposition, Tom Hutchinson (Ronald Fraser). After arranging for the Shadow Home Secretary Sir Eric Bentley (Ronald Culver) to give an inflammatory anti-immigration speech to give Hutchinson a pretext for firing him and to demonstrate the Conservatives' opposition to immigration without outlining specific policies, Rimmer becomes the MP for Bentley's now-vacant seat of Budleigh Moor (a reference to Cook's frequent collaborator, Dudley Moore). Along the way, he acquires a trophy wife (Vanessa Howard).

Relying on a combination of charisma and deception—and murder—he then rapidly works his way up the political ladder to become prime minister (after throwing his predecessor off an oil rig). Rimmer then gains ultimate control by requiring the populace to engage in endless postal voting and televoting on trivial or complex matters. At last, exhausted, they acquiesce in one final vote which passes dictatorial power to him. Ferret attempts to assassinate Rimmer as he and his wife ride through the capital in an open-topped convertible, but fails and falls to his death.

Cast
 Peter Cook as Michael Rimmer 
 Denholm Elliott as Peter Niss 
 Ronald Fraser as Tom Hutchinson 
 Vanessa Howard as Patricia Cartwright 
 Arthur Lowe as "Ferret"
 George A. Cooper as "Blacket" 
 Harold Pinter as Steven Hench 
 James Cossins as Crodder 
 Roland Culver as Sir Eric Bentley 
 Dudley Foster as Federman  
 Dennis Price as Fairburn 
 Ronnie Corbett as Interviewer
 John Cleese as Pumer 
 Diana Coupland as Mrs. Spimm
 Michael Bates as Mr. Spimm
 Graham Chapman as Fromage
 Valerie Leon as Tanya
 Zakes Mokae as Mugger (uncredited)

Production
The concept of the film was devised by David Frost in 1967, and the first draft of the screenplay was then co-written by Cleese and Chapman, during a three-month sabbatical in Ibiza. Cook was lined up to star, but it took another two years before funding could be secured. It was the third of three films Cook was contracted to make for Columbia, the previous two being The Wrong Box and A Dandy in Aspic.

Cook, Cleese, Chapman and director Kevin Billington jointly reworked the script prior to filming, and Cook reportedly made a strong contribution to the final script. It was produced during 1969, and the team hoped it would maximise its topicality with a release prior to the forthcoming UK general elections (the result of which it in fact predicted). However, the studio feared that it might become a source of controversy, so the film was held back until November 1970, almost a year after the election, thus losing most of its topical 'punch'.

The film is also notable for its distinguished cast of well-known British comedy and character actors, including Cleese and Chapman, Denholm Elliott, Arthur Lowe, Dennis Price, Ronald Fraser, Michael Trubshawe, Julian Glover, Michael Bates, and cameos by Ronnie Corbett and renowned stage and screenwriter Harold Pinter. The film also reunited Corbett, Cleese, Chapman and Frost, all of whom had worked extensively together during the 1960s on That Was The Week That Was and The Frost Report (although only Cleese appears with Corbett on screen).

The story satirises many well-known British political figures including Harold Wilson, Edward Heath, and Enoch Powell, and although the resemblances were played down at the time of the film's release, Cook later admitted that the title character of Rimmer was heavily based on David Frost himself. Like Frost, Rimmer effectively appears from nowhere, "rises without trace" (the famous phrase coined by Jonathan Miller to describe Frost's ascent to prominence) and becomes one of the most influential people in the country. The imitation even extended to Cook copying Frost's standard greeting of the time, "Super to see you", and the coincidental fact that the set of Rimmer's living room was almost identical to Frost's real living room, even though the designer had never seen it.

Alongside the more overt satire and parodies of prominent public figures, the movie also includes numerous hidden jokes and visual gags. For example, in the scene in which Arthur Lowe gropes his secretary's legs as she stands in front of a shelf, the spine of one of the folders on the shelf is clearly marked with a swastika. In Harold Pinter's cameo appearance as fictional TV host Steven Hench, the initials of his show's title, "Steven Hench is Talking To You" spell S-H-I-T-T-Y. Most obvious is that of the surname, Rimmer, which is a slang term for someone who engages in oral intercourse with the anus, i.e., an arselicker.

Release
The film had its world premiere on 12 November 1970 as the first film at the newly-opened Warner Rendezvous in Leicester Square, London.

Reception
Cook's performance was panned by critics, and both he and John Cleese subsequently acknowledged that he did not perform well. The commercial and critical failure of the movie, which did not receive an American release, effectively dashed Cook's hopes of establishing himself as a solo screen star - although he appeared in many more film and TV projects, he only co-starred (with Dudley Moore) in one other film, and Rimmer proved to be his only solo starring film role.

References

External links 
 
 The Rise and Rise of Michael Rimmer downloadable English SDH subtitle set (for use with the commercially released, but unsubtitled, DVD)

1970 films
1970s English-language films
1970 comedy films
1970s satirical films
1970s political comedy films
British political comedy films
British satirical films
Films about advertising
Films directed by Kevin Billington
Films scored by John Cameron
1970s British films